Carnelian is a studio album by American hip hop group Kill the Vultures. It was released October 23, 2015 on F to I to X and Totally Gross National Product.

Music 
The album is entirely produced by Anatomy, with guest appearances of multiple musicians playing live instruments.

Release 
In the time upcoming the album's release, the group released the single "The Jackyl: which featured Channy Leaneagh of the alternative rock band Poliça. On October 12, 2015, a music video for the song "Topsoil" was released on YouTube via F to I to X.

Track listing 

Notes
 "Amnesia" ends at 3:09 and contains the track "Last Time" after 0:25 seconds of silence.

Personnel
Credits adapted from liner notes.

Kill the Vultures
 Anatomy - producer, recorded by
 Crescent Moon - vocals
Other musicians
 Adam Meckler - trumpet (7)
 Anil Partridge - violin (3)
 Channy Leaneagh - vocals (13)
 Chris Cunningham - guitar (11)
 deVon Gray - strings (3), piano (9)
 Graham O'Brien - bells (1), cymbal (1, 9, 10, 12, 13), floor tom (9), bass drum (10), tambourine (13)
 Jaqueline Ferrier-Ultan - cello (1, 3)
 Jeremy Ylvisaker - guitar (5, 6)
 Jon Davis - horns (1), bass (2-4, 7-9, 11-13), tenor saxophone (7, 8)
 Michelle Kinney - cello (3)
 Pete Whitman - soprano saxophone (8)
 Peter Pisano - guitar (2)
 Scott Agster - trombone (13)
 Tasha Baron - flute (2)
Technical personnel
 Adam Krinsky - mixed by 
 Huntley Miller - mastered by
 Kai Benson - artwork, design
 Rob Oesterlin - additional recording (3, 8, 9, 13)

References

External links 
 Carnelian at Bandcamp
 Carnelian at Discogs

Hip hop albums by American artists
2015 albums